Shaviyani may refer to:

Shaviyani Atoll, an administrative division of the Maldives.
Shaviyani, the second consonant of the Thaana abugaida used in Dhivehi.